Papyrus 107 (in the Gregory-Aland numbering), designated by , is a copy of the New Testament in Greek. It is a papyrus manuscript of the Gospel of John, containing verses 17:1-2 & 17:11 in a fragmentary condition. The manuscript has been paleographically assigned to the early 3rd century CE. The manuscript currently is housed at the Sackler Library (Papyrology Rooms, P. Oxy. 4446) at Oxford.

Description
The original manuscript would've had around 33 lines per page. The extant portion is too small to determine height and width. The handwriting script is either documentary or common. The text is erratic, and doesn't really agree with any major text-type, bearing most resemblance with Codex Washingtonianus (W).

Textual Variants
John 17:1
και ο  (υιος): 
και ο  (υιος) σου: C(2).3, L, Ψ, f13, 33, q, vgmss; Orpt
ο  (υιος): א, B, C*, W, 0109, 0301, pc, d, e, ff2, pbo; Orpt
ο  (υιος) σου: A, D, Θ, 0250, 1, 579, l 844, pc, lat, sy

John 17:2 (1)
δως: , W, L
δωση: א2, A, C, K, 0250, 33, al
δωσω: 0109, א*, pc
δωσει: B, Ψ, 0301, f13, 
εχη: D

John 17:2 (2)
αυτω: , א, W, 0109, pc
αυτοις: א2, A, B, C, K, Ψ, 0250, 0301, f13, 33, al
omit. : D

John 17:11 (1)
Insert ουκετι ειμι εν τω κοσμω, και εν τω κοσμω ειμι between ερχομαι and πατερ
incl. : , D, (a c), r1
omit. : , א, A, B, C, L, K, W, Θ, Ψ, 

John 17:11 (2)
ω δεδωκας: , A, B, C, Θ, Ψ, f13, 1, 
ο δεδωκας: D*, 1424, pc
ους δεδωκας: D1, (N), 209, 892, al, aur, f, q, vg

John 17:11 (2)
εν καθως ημεις: , א, A, C, D, 
omit. : , it, ac2

See also 

 List of New Testament papyri
 Oxyrhynchus Papyri
 Gospel of John: chapter 17

References

Further reading 

 W. E. H. Cockle, The Oxyrhynchus Papyri LXV (London: 1998), pp. 14–16.

External links

Images 
 P.Oxy.LXIV 4446 from Papyrology at Oxford's "POxy: Oxyrhynchus Online"
 𝔓107 recto, John 17:11
 𝔓107 verso, John 17:1-2

Official registration 
 "Continuation of the Manuscript List" Institute for New Testament Textual Research, University of Münster. Retrieved April 9, 2008

New Testament papyri
3rd-century biblical manuscripts
Early Greek manuscripts of the New Testament
Gospel of John papyri